Marit Adeleide Andreassen (born 29 March 1966 in Svolvær, Nordland) is a Norwegian actress, born in Svolvær.

She graduated from the Norwegian National Academy of Theatre in 1993, and has since worked both at Oslo Nye Teater and at Nationaltheatret (the National Theatre), where she has acted in such plays as Henrik Ibsen's Hedda Gabler and Peer Gynt.

Andreassen is also known from radio, TV and movies. On radio she takes part in the weekly satire show "Hallo i uken". She had a role in the TV-comedy "Nr. 13" (1998), and in the movies Jonny Vang (2003) and 37 og et halvt (2005).

Select filmography
 Evas øye (1999)
 Pan (1995)
 "Pelle politibil" (TV, 1993)
 "Nr. 13" (TV, 1998)
 Jonny Vang (2003)
 37 og et halvt (2005)
 Andreaskorset (2004)
 Kalde føtter (2006)
 De 7 dødssyndene (2000)
 "Slangebæreren" (TV, 2005)
 alle sammen sammen nrk tv
 Oljefondet (the oil fund) serie

References

External links

1966 births
Living people
People from Vågan
Norwegian film actresses
Norwegian stage actresses
Norwegian television actresses
Oslo National Academy of the Arts alumni